Toronto grand prix may refer to:

Motorsports
Races at Mosport, part of the Greater Toronto Area (GTA)
 Mosport Grand Prix (disambiguation)

Other races
 Grand Prix of Toronto (Molson Indy Toronto),  USAC-CART-PPG-Champ-IndyCar race on the streets of Toronto

Figure skating
ISU Grand Prix - Skate Canada International
 2000 Skate Canada International, in Mississauga, GTA
 2003 Skate Canada International, in Mississauga, GTA
 2016 Skate Canada International, in Mississauga, GTA